Edward Rich may refer to:

Edward Rich, 6th Earl of Warwick, 3rd Earl of Holland (1673–1701)
Edward Rich, 7th Earl of Warwick, 4th Earl of Holland (1697–1721)
Edward Rich, 8th Earl of Warwick, 5th Earl of Holland (1695–1759)

See also
Edward Riche, Canadian writer